Sir Ian Livingstone  (born 29 December 1949) is an English fantasy author and entrepreneur. Along with Steve Jackson, he is the co-founder of a series of role-playing gamebooks, Fighting Fantasy, and the author of many books within that series. He is the co-founder of Games Workshop in 1975 and helped create Eidos Interactive as executive chairman of Eidos plc in 1995.

Early life

Livingstone attended Altrincham Grammar School for Boys, where, according to him, he only earned one A-level, in Geography. He has kept his close links with the school and has visited it on numerous occasions, including to donate money for a refurbishment of the ICT suite, and to present awards to GCSE recipients in 1998.

Career

Games Workshop
Livingstone co-founded Games Workshop in early 1975 with flatmates John Peake and Steve Jackson. They started publishing a monthly newsletter, Owl and Weasel, and sent copies of the first issue to subscribers of the recently defunct fanzine Albion; Brian Blume received one of these copies, and sent them a copy of the new game Dungeons & Dragons in return. Livingstone and Jackson felt that this game was more imaginative than anything being produced in the UK at the time, and so worked out an arrangement with Blume for an exclusive deal to sell D&D in Europe. They began distributing Dungeons & Dragons and other TSR products later in 1975. In late 1975, Livingstone and Jackson organised their first convention, the first Games Day. Because they were selling products out of their flat, people would come looking for a store that did not exist; because of this they were evicted in the summer of 1976.

Under the direction of Livingstone and Jackson, Games Workshop expanded from a bedroom mail order company to a successful gaming manufacturer and retail chain, with the first Games Workshop store opening in Hammersmith in 1977. In June of that year, partially to advertise the opening, Livingstone and Jackson launched the gaming magazine White Dwarf, with Livingstone as the editor. Livingstone picked the title, which had meaning for both fantasy and science fiction readers: a white dwarf could be a stellar phenomenon or a fantasy character. Livingstone stepped down as editor of the magazine after White Dwarf #74 (February 1986).

In 1980, Livingstone and Jackson began to develop the concept of the Fighting Fantasy gamebook series, the first volume of which (The Warlock of Firetop Mountain) was published in 1982 by Puffin Books. Livingstone and Jackson sold Games Workshop in 1991 for  million. The pair, together with Bryan Ansell, founded Citadel Miniatures in Newark to make miniatures for games. Livingstone has also invented several board games, including Boom Town, Judge Dredd, Automania, Legend of Zagor, and Dragonmasters.

Fighting Fantasy
In 1982, Jackson and Livingstone co-wrote The Warlock of Firetop Mountain, the first book in the Fighting Fantasy series, but following an instruction from publishers Penguin to write more books "as quickly as possible" the pair wrote subsequent books separately. The series had sold over 18 million copies as of 2017, with Livingstone's Deathtrap Dungeon selling over 350,000 copies in its first year alone. Livingstone wrote another twelve Fighting Fantasy gamebooks, including The Forest of Doom, City of Thieves and Caverns of the Snow Witch before marking the 30th anniversary of The Warlock of Firetop Mountain with a new gamebook, Blood of the Zombies, in 2012, and with The Port of Peril in 2017 for the 35th anniversary.

Videogame industry
In the mid-1980s Livingstone did design work for video game publisher Domark; he returned to the company in 1993 as a major investor and board member. Livingstone later recounted, "After the success of Games Workshop, I retired, got bored, and invested in Domark to fund their cartridge development. I got in at just the wrong time - it was all going flat." In 1995, Domark was acquired by the video technology company Eidos Interactive, which had been floated on the London Stock Exchange in 1990, and formed the major part of the newly created Eidos Interactive. In 2005 Eidos was taken over by SCi and Livingstone was the only former board member to be retained, taking on the role of product acquisition director. Livingstone secured many of the company's major franchises, including Tomb Raider and Hitman. He contributed to the Tomb Raider project Tomb Raider: Anniversary (an enhanced version of the original Tomb Raider game), which was released in 2007. In 2009, Japanese video-game company Square Enix completed a buyout of Eidos Interactive and Livingstone was promoted to Life President of Eidos, a position he resigned from in 2013.

In 2014 Livingstone appeared in the documentary feature film From Bedrooms to Billions (2014) a film that tells the story of the British Video Games Industry from 1979 to present. In 2021 Freeway Fighters received an adaptation on Viber and messenger, created by a Talk-a-Bot chatbot company over Viber and messenger.

Skills Champion
In 2010 Livingstone was asked to act as the Skills Champion by government minister Ed Vaizey, tasked with producing a report reviewing the UK video games industry. The 'NextGen' report, co-authored with Alex Hope of visual effects firm Double Negative, was released in 2011; Livingstone described it as a "complete bottom up review of the whole education system relating to games." A school named Livingstone Academy was planned for 2021.

Awards and honours
In 2002, Livingstone won the BAFTA Interactive Special Award for outstanding contribution to the industry.
Livingstone was appointed Officer of the Order of the British Empire (OBE) in the 2006 New Year Honours, and Commander of the Order of the British Empire (CBE) in the 2013 New Year Honours both for services to the computer gaming industry.
In 2011, Livingstone received an Honorary Doctorate of Arts from Bournemouth University.
Livingstone was knighted in the 2022 New Year Honours for services to the online gaming industry.

Bibliography

Fighting Fantasy
 The Warlock of Firetop Mountain (1982) with Steve Jackson, Puffin Books
 The Forest of Doom (1983)
 City of Thieves (1983)
 Deathtrap Dungeon (1984)
 Island of the Lizard King (1984)
 Caverns of the Snow Witch (1984)
 Freeway Fighter (1985)
 Temple of Terror (1985)
 Trial of Champions (1986)
 Crypt of the Sorceror (1987)
 Armies of Death (1988)
 Return to Firetop Mountain (1992)
 Eye of the Dragon (2005)
 Blood of the Zombies (2012)
 The Port of Peril (2017)
 Assassins of Allansia (2019)
 Shadow of the Giants (2022)

Fighting Fantasy First Adventures: Adventures of Goldhawk
 Darkmoon's Curse (1995)
 The Demon Spider (1995)
 Mudworm Swamp (1995)
 Ghost Road (1995)

Other works
 Dicing with Dragons (1982)
Eureka! (1984), Domark
 Shadowmaster (1992) with Marc Gascoigne
 Casket of Souls (1987)Board Games in 100 Moves: 8,000 Years of Play (2019) with James WallisDice Men: The Origin Story of Games Workshop (2022)

 References 

 Further reading 

 Raider of the Costly Art - Interview OPENThe Next Gen Report co-authored with David Hope (Nesta, 2011)
Ian Livingstone interview – Interview with SquareGo about working as Life President for Square-Enix Europe
Interview with Pocket-lint talking about Facebook gaming, Fighting Fantasy'', and his new venture Appertyze

Biography (part 1) at EidosInteractive.co.uk (archived 2010-03-04)
 Speech at Games Based Learning Conference, London, 2009 (archived 2013-04-18)

External links

 
 
 

1949 births
BAFTA winners (people)
British gamebook writers
Commanders of the Order of the British Empire
Dungeons & Dragons game designers
English fantasy writers
Fighting Fantasy
Games Workshop
Knights Bachelor
Living people
People educated at Altrincham Grammar School for Boys
People from Prestbury, Cheshire